Steven Caple Jr. (born February 16, 1988) is an American film director, producer, and screenwriter. His credits include The Land (2016), Creed II (2018), A Different Tree, and Prentice-N-Fury's Ice Cream Adventure. In 2017, Forbes named Caple Jr. one of the "30 Under 30" in Hollywood & Entertainment. He also will direct Transformers: Rise of the Beasts (2023), the seventh live-action Transformers film.

Career
Caple caught his first big break when his student film A Different Tree won HBO's Short Film Competition in 2013.

Caple's feature film debut The Land premiered at the 2016 Sundance Film Festival, where it was acquired by IFC Films. It tells the story of four teenage boys who devote their summer to escaping the streets of Cleveland to pursue a dream life of professional skateboarding. The film was released on July 29, 2016. Caple would go on to be named by The Playlist as one of the 25 best breakthrough directors of 2016.

Caple recently wrote HBO's high-profile Emmett Till project, produced by Will Smith, Casey Affleck and Jay-Z. The six-episode miniseries is adapted from Devery Anderson's 2015 biography, Emmett Till: The Murder That Shocked The World And Propelled The Civil Rights Movement. It is based on the real-life story of 14-year-old black teen Emmett Till, who was brutally murdered after allegedly flirting with a white woman in Mississippi in 1955.

Caple's next film was the 2018 sports action drama film Creed II, a sequel to 2015 film Creed and the eighth installment in the Rocky film series.  Stallone said of appointing Caple as director: “I believe it's important for the director to also be a part of this generation like I was in mine, to make the story as relatable as possible. We are extremely lucky to have the talented young filmmaker Steven Caple Jr. step up and accept the role of director. I am confident that he and Michael B. Jordan will hit it out of the park!” Production of Creed II began in spring 2018. The film was released on November 21, 2018 and received positive reviews.

Filmography
Film

Television

Music video
 Machine Gun Kelly: "Dopeman" (2017)

References

External links
 

Living people
Skydance Media people
Film directors from Ohio
Baldwin Wallace University alumni
Date of birth unknown
Film producers from Ohio
Screenwriters from Ohio
1988 births